Eriogonum abertianum, with the common names Abert's buckwheat and Abert wild buckwheat, is a species of buckwheats in the family Polygonaceae.

Distribution
This annual herb is native to: Northern Mexico in Coahuila, Chihuahua, Sonora, and San Luis Potosí states; and the Southwestern United States within Arizona, New Mexico, and Texas.

Habitats it is found in include the Chihuahuan Desert and Sonoran Desert.

Description

Its leaves are tomentose, and greenish, tawny, or reddish on both surfaces (1-4 × 1-3 cm).

The 3–4.5 mm flowers are white, pink, or yellow. It bloom period is year round.

Pollinator plant
This species is a food source for adult Crescent Metalmark butterflies (Apodemia phyciodoides).  It is also of special value to native bees.

See also

References

External links
SEINet, Arizona Chapter: photo gallery of Eriogonum abertianum

abertianum
Flora of the Chihuahuan Desert
Flora of the Sonoran Deserts
Flora of Arizona
Flora of Chihuahua (state)
Flora of Coahuila
Flora of New Mexico
Flora of San Luis Potosí
Flora of Sonora
Flora of Texas
Taxa named by John Torrey
Butterfly food plants